This is a list of audio plays based on the long-running British comic series 2000 A.D., produced by Big Finish Productions.  Twenty-two plays have been released to date.

Toby Longworth appears in most of the plays as the voice of Judge Dredd, with other characters voiced by a variety of other actors, including several who have appeared in Big Finish's Doctor Who series.  Two plays were spin-offs featuring characters from Strontium Dog, with Simon Pegg as Johnny Alpha.

Content

Series One

Crime Chronicles

See also
Big Finish Productions

References

External links
Big Finish Productions

Big Finish Productions
Judge Dredd
Judge Dredd